Trevor Rhodes may refer to:

Trevor Rhodes (footballer, born 1909) (1909–1993), English footballer
Trevor Rhodes (footballer, born 1948), English footballer
Trevor Murdoch (born 1980), American wrestler who used the alias of Trevor Rhodes